The 2020 Spanish Indoor Athletics Championships was the 56th edition of the annual indoor track and field competition organised by the Royal Spanish Athletics Federation (RFEA), which serves as the Spanish national indoor championship for the sport. A total of 26 events (divided evenly between the sexes) were contested over two days on 29 February and 1 March at the Pista Cubierta de Expourense in Ourense, Galicia.

Results

Men

Women

References

Results
LVI Campeonato de España Absoluto de Atletismo. RFEA. Retrieved 2020-09-07.

External links
Official website for the Royal Spanish Athletics Federation

Spanish Indoor Athletics Championships
Spanish Indoor Athletics Championships
Spanish Indoor Athletics Championships
Spanish Indoor Athletics Championships
Sport in Ourense